The 1979–80 Yorkshire Football League was the 54th season in the history of the Yorkshire Football League, a football competition in England.

Division One

Division One featured 12 clubs which competed in the previous season, along with four new clubs, promoted from Division Two:
Fryston Colliery Welfare
Liversedge
Ossett Albion
Thorne Colliery

League table

Map

Division Two

Division Two featured eight clubs which competed in the previous season, along with eight new clubs.
Clubs relegated from Division One:
Bentley Victoria Welfare
Kiveton Park
Lincoln United
Tadcaster Albion
Clubs promoted from Division Three:
Harworth Colliery Institute
BSC Parkgate
Stocksbridge Works
York Railway Institute

League table

Map

Division Three

Division Three featured nine clubs which competed in the previous season, along with seven new clubs.
Clubs relegated from Division Two:
Rawmarsh Welfare
Wombwell Sporting Association
Worsbrough Bridge Miners Welfare Athletic
Plus:
Pontefract Collieries

League table

Map

League Cup

Final

References

Yorkshire Football League
8